John Cadman, 1st Baron Cadman  (7 September 1877 – 31 May 1941), was a British mining engineer, petroleum technologist and public servant.

Early life
Cadman was educated at Armstrong College, University of Durham, and received a first class Honours in Geology in 1899.

Career
Cadman served as Inspector of Mines in Trinidad and Tobago in the first decade of the 20th century. At that time Trinidad and Tobago was a British Colony. As Inspector of Mines he was responsible for the commercialization of Trinidad's oil in 1907. In this effort Cadman was joined by Arthur "Beeby" Thompson who was an engineer with oilfield experience in Russia.

Cadman later went on to teach petroleum engineering at Birmingham University in the UK. Cadman is credited with creating the course "Petroleum Engineering".

He was well known for his love of shellfish.

He was later Chairman of the Anglo-Persian Oil Company in the 1930s. He expanded production fourfold and eventually joined a venture by Henri Deterding of Royal Dutch/Shell to stabilize petroleum prices.

Marriage and family
Cadman married Lilian Harrigan in 1907. The couple had four children, daughters Marguerite and Sybil, and sons John and Denys.

Honours
He was created CMG in 1916, KCMG in 1918 and GCMG in 1929. On 7 June 1937 he was raised to the peerage as Baron Cadman, of Silverdale in the County of Stafford.

In 1940 he was elected a Fellow of the Royal Society.

On 17 May 2007 Silverdale Parish Council voted to name a new street "Cadman Close" in honour of Lord Cadman.

See also 

 Anglo-Persian Oil Company
 Abdolhossein Teymourtash

References

External links
 

1877 births
1941 deaths
Knights Grand Cross of the Order of St Michael and St George
English businesspeople
Alumni of Armstrong College, Durham
Fellows of the Royal Society
Academics of the University of Birmingham
People from Silverdale, Staffordshire
BP people
Barons created by George VI